Petr Vitásek (born 5 August 1981 in Ostrava) is a Czech rower.

References 
 
 

1981 births
Living people
Czech male rowers
Sportspeople from Ostrava
Olympic rowers of the Czech Republic
Rowers at the 2004 Summer Olympics
Rowers at the 2008 Summer Olympics
World Rowing Championships medalists for the Czech Republic